The Old Live Oak City Hall (also known as the City of Live Oak Police and Fire Department) is a historic site in Live Oak, Florida, United States. It is located at 212 North Ohio Avenue, between West Duval Street Northeast and Haines Street Northeast. On April 24, 1986, it was added to the U.S. National Register of Historic Places. The old city hall is one block north of the Union Depot and Atlantic Coast Line Freight Station.

References

External links
 Suwannee County listings, Florida's Office of Cultural and Historical Programs

Live Oak City Hall
Live Oak City Hall
Live Oak City Hall
Towers in Florida
National Register of Historic Places in Suwannee County, Florida
Government buildings completed in 1909
1909 establishments in Florida